Zsófia Döme (born 18 June 1992) is an alpine skier from Hungary.  She competed for Hungary at the 2010 Winter Olympics.  Her best result was a 36th in the super-G.

References

External links
 
 
 

1992 births
Hungarian female alpine skiers
Alpine skiers at the 2010 Winter Olympics
Olympic alpine skiers of Hungary
Living people